Kalar is a city in the Kurdistan Region in Iraq, located on the west bank of the Sirwan (Diyala) river in Sulaymaniyah Governorate. It is located east of Kifri and west of the towns of Qasri Shirin and Sarpol Zahab, located in Kermanshah .

Climate
Kalar is located in the Garmian Region in Southern Kurdistan and is known for having a warm and dry climate, occasionally reaching over 50°C (122°F) in the summer. It is warmest in July and coldest in January. The temperature rarely reaches below 0°C (32°F) in the winter. According to the Köppen-Geiger climate classification system, Kalar has a Semi-arid climate (BSh).

Notable inhabitants 
 Kawa Garmeyani

See also 
Garmekan (Sasanian province located in modern day Kurdistan Region of Iraq)
Garmian Region
Beth Garmai

References

Populated places in Sulaymaniyah Province
Kurdish settlements in Iraq